Brent Cross is originally the name of a crossroads that today forms a major interchange for traffic in the London Borough of Barnet, England. Located a mile from the centres of Hendon and Golders Green, the area also contains the Brent Cross Shopping Centre, a major retail facility which opened in 1976, as well as Brent South Shopping Park opposite of it. The "Brent Cross Flyover" A41 runs to the east of the shopping centre over the A406 North Circular Road, while the M1 motorway and A5 Edgware Road are to the west at Staples Corner interchange. In addition, the Northern line (Edgware branch) and Thameslink rail routes run on viaducts.

The River Brent passes through the area, flowing from east to west in a man-made channel. The Shopping Centre falls within the NW4 postcode district; the Brent South Retail Park falls within NW2; and the Brent Cross tube station is within NW11.

History 
"Brent Cross" was originally the name of a crossroads in the vicinity of the current Brent Cross Flyover. By 1944, the term was being used to describe addresses north of the A406 North Circular Road and west of the A41 Hendon Way and after the eponymous shopping centre was built it was also used to describe business addresses south of the North Circular.

Previously the area had been known as Renters Farm, a name dating from 1309, and it remained largely farmland until the nineteenth century. In the late nineteenth century a sewage works was built there and Hendon Greyhound Stadium stood there from 1935 to 1972. In 1976 the Brent Cross Shopping Centre was opened, the first stand-alone shopping centre to be built in the United Kingdom.

In the 1920s and 1930s, two major roads through the area were constructed, the east–west A406 North Circular Road and the north–south A41 Hendon Way. In 1923 the Northern line (Edgware branch) was extended on a short viaduct over the River Brent.

In 1964–1965 the Brent Cross Flyover was built to carry the Hendon Way over the North Circular. During its construction, a fatal accident occurred on 20 June 1964 while erecting a large crane at the site. The crane jib buckled and collapsed onto a coach travelling east on the North Circular Road killing seven passengers on board. A question was raised in Parliament about the accident on 22 June.

In the 1970s, the North Circular Road was upgraded with a huge east–west flyover rising from Brent Cross above both the A5 road and the railway line. The M1 motorway was extended south to meet the North Circular Road slip roads below this flyover. That same decade, the shopping centre opened.

Brent South Shopping Park, a  retail park, was built in 2004. The park has 10 retail stores including Next, DFS and Sports Direct.

Brent Cross Cricklewood development 

Brent Cross Cricklewood is a planned new town centre development in Hendon and Cricklewood. The development is planned to cost around £4.5 billion to construct and will include 7,500 homes,  of offices, four parks, transport improvements and a  extension of Brent Cross Shopping Centre. The developers of the scheme are Hammerson and Abrdn. 200 new retail stores are included in the original plan. To counter the disruption of the area by the building works, the developers have offered to 'green up' the bridge over the North Circular and maintain it as a 'living bridge' making a horticultural contribution to the basic scheme. As market for new retail stores changes and demand is expected to decline with the shift to online shopping, BXS is changing its delivery plan and intends to focus on residential development first. Construction was planned to start in 2018 and be completed in 2021-22 but the retail development has currently been put on hold.

The London Underground stations nearest to the shopping centre are Brent Cross and Hendon Central, both on the Northern line. According to the council, both "feel very remote and lack adequate pedestrian links and signage", and the 10 to 15-minute walks are through "a hostile pedestrian environment.". Transport schemes have been proposed involving Brent Cross, as part of, or concurrent to, the Brent Cross Cricklewood development. These include
measures promoted by the Brent Cross Cricklewood developers but the subjects of objections to their planning application, including
a new railway station on the Thameslink line
new bridges over the A406 North Circular, but the removal of another bridge
moving the bus station closer to the A406 North Circular
significant changes to the road network within and around the development.

Gallery

References

External links 

Brent Cross Cricklewood developers' website
Area Regeneration plan
Further information on Brent Cross Shopping Centre

Road junctions in London
Districts of the London Borough of Barnet